Diacamma rugosum, also known as the Bornean queenless ant, is a species of ant of the subfamily Ponerinae. It is found in many countries throughout Southeast Asia. 20 subspecies are recognized.

D. rugosum is noted for being one of the only species of ants to completely lack a queen caste. Reproduction is done entirely by workers, with all workers being fertile upon birth. However, reproduction is kept strictly under control in the nest, with only one dominant female, or gamergate, laying all of the eggs. The gamergate will render workers sterile by mutilating their vestigial wing buds as soon as they pupate. These infertile workers, called callows, will remain loyal to the present gamergate and allow her to exercise control over the rest of the workers. This works to reduce colony infighting as it makes usurpation virtually impossible, and the only time the gamergate is replaced is if she dies naturally.

Subspecies
Diacamma rugosum anceps Matsumura & Uchida, 1926 - China
Diacamma rugosum arcuatum Karavaiev, 1925 - Indonesia
Diacamma rugosum balinense Karavaiev, 1925 - Indonesia
Diacamma rugosum birmanum Emery, 1887 - Myanmar
Diacamma rugosum celebense Emery, 1887 - Indonesia, Sulawesi
Diacamma rugosum doveri Mukerjee, 1934 - India
Diacamma rugosum gibbosum Karavaiev, 1935 - Vietnam
Diacamma rugosum hortense Karavaiev, 1925 - Indonesia
Diacamma rugosum javanum Emery, 1887 - Indonesia
Diacamma rugosum jerdoni Forel, 1903 - India
Diacamma rugosum latispinum Karavaiev, 1925 - Indonesia
Diacamma rugosum lombokense Emery, 1897 - Indonesia
Diacamma rugosum longiceps Santschi, 1932 - Vietnam
Diacamma rugosum ovale Karavaiev, 1935 - Vietnam
Diacamma rugosum rothneyi Forel, 1900 - India
Diacamma rugosum rugosum (Le Guillou, 1842)  - Borneo, Indonesia, New Guinea, Philippines, Singapore, Bangladesh, India, Sri Lanka, Thailand, Vietnam, China
Diacamma rugosum sculptum Jerdon, 1851 - Bangladesh, India, Nepal
Diacamma rugosum sikkimense Forel, 1903 - India
Diacamma rugosum timorense Emery, 1887 - Indonesia, Timor
Diacamma rugosum viridipurpureum Emery, 1893 - Philippine, India, China

References

External links

 at antwiki.org

Ponerinae
Hymenoptera of Asia
Insects described in 1842